Pirate King or Covemaster may refer to: 

 Pirate King (boardgame), a strategy boardgame
 Pirate King (novel), a 2011 novel by Laurie R. King
 The Pirate King, a 2008 novel by R. A. Salvatore
 Gol D. Roger, a character known as Pirate King in the world of One Piece
 Elizabeth Swann, a character from the Pirates of the Caribbean film franchise
 "The Pirate King", a song from Disney's Pirates of the Caribbean: Swashbuckling Sea Songs
 The Pirate King, a fictional character in The Pirates of Penzance
 "Pirate King", a song by the K-pop group ATEEZ from their album Treasure EP.1: All to Zero

See also
 King of Pirates Online, the Chinese title of the video game Tales of Pirates